Nahata Dziil, sometimes written Nahatadzill, is a Chapter situated in Apache County, Arizona, United States. It is one of the Chapters which make up the Fort Defiance Agency, one of five agencies which comprise the Navajo Nation. As of the 2010 census, the Chapter had a total population of 1,731, of whom 1,572 were Navajo. In 1991, it became the 110th and final Chapter of the Navajo Nation.

References

Populated places in Apache County, Arizona
Navajo Nation